William Haskell Alsup (born June 27, 1945) is a Senior United States district judge of the United States District Court for the Northern District of California.

Early life and career 

Born in Jackson, Mississippi, Alsup received a Bachelor of Science degree in mathematics from Mississippi State University in 1967, a Juris Doctor from Harvard Law School in 1971, and a Master of Public Policy from Harvard University's John F. Kennedy School of Government in 1971.

He was a law clerk to Justice William O. Douglas of the Supreme Court of the United States from 1971 to 1972. Alsup was in private practice in San Francisco, California from 1972 to 1978, and was then an Assistant to the United States Solicitor General in the United States Department of Justice from 1978 to 1980. He returned to his private practice in San Francisco from 1980 to 1998 with Morrison & Foerster, when he briefly served as a special counsel in the Antitrust Division of the Department of Justice in 1998. He was again in private practice in San Francisco from 1998 to 1999.

Federal judicial service 

On March 24, 1999, Alsup was nominated by President Bill Clinton to a seat on the United States District Court for the Northern District of California vacated by Thelton Henderson. Alsup was confirmed by the United States Senate on July 30, 1999, and received his commission on August 17, 1999. He assumed senior status on January 21, 2021.

Notable cases 

Alsup presided over the 2012 and 2016 jury trials in Oracle America, Inc. v. Google, Inc., which concerns the APIs of Java SE and Android. He drew media attention for his familiarity with programming languages, at one point criticizing Oracle counsel David Boies for arguing that the Java function rangeCheck was novel, saying that he had "written blocks of code like rangeCheck a hundred times or more". Alsup was widely described as having learned Java in order to better understand the case, although a 2017 profile in The Verge he stated that he had not learned a significant amount of Java, but had rather applied his knowledge as a longtime hobbyist BASIC programmer. The Federal Circuit overturned his determination that the Java API was not copyrightable. In 2021 the U.S. Supreme Court made no decision on copyrightability but decided that, even if copyright existed, Google's use of the API had been fair use and so not unlawful.

Alsup was also the presiding judge in what is believed to be the first trial against the U.S. no-fly policy, which is a list of people who cannot use commercial aircraft in the United States. Regarding the removal of people incorrectly included in the list, he ruled that, "[t]he government's administrative remedies fall short of such relief and do not supply sufficient due process."

In August 2020, Judge Alsup sentenced Anthony Levandowski to 18 months in prison for one count of trade secret theft, for stealing technology from Google's Waymo to found Otto, a self driving startup, then selling it to Uber six months later for $680 million.  In May 2017, Judge Alsup had ordered Levandowski to refrain from working on Otto's Lidar and required Uber to disclose its discussions on the technology.

Deferred Action for Childhood Arrivals 

In September 2017, Judge Alsup was assigned four cases by parties suing to halt President Trump's decision to end the Deferred Action for Childhood Arrivals program created by Barack Obama. On December 20, the Supreme Court unanimously issued an opinion urging Judge Alsup to consider arguments by the Trump administration that ending DACA was within executive authority and is not reviewable by federal courts.

On January 9, 2018, he granted a temporary injunction halting President Trump's rescission of DACA.

Dismissal of Lawsuit Against ExxonMobil 

On July 27, 2018, Judge Alsup dismissed a lawsuit targeting ExxonMobil on the basis that two California cities, San Francisco and Oakland, could not prove the energy company was responsible for climate change in the state.

Student loans

On November 17, 2022, Alsup ruled in favor of 200,000 student loan borrowers in a class action lawsuit who claim that they were defrauded by for-profit colleges/universities. Alsup calls the program's backlog "an impossible quagmire... As of now, approximately 443,000 borrowers have pending borrower-defense applications. That is a staggering number. If, hypothetically, the Department's Borrower Defense Unit had all 33 of its claim adjudicators working 40 hours a week, 52 weeks a year (no holidays or vacation), with each claim adjudicator processing two claims per day, it would take the Department more than twenty-five years to get through the backlog." Alsup's ruling was based on borrower defense, which allows students to have their loans forgiven if the university lies to them about their job prospects, credit transferability or likely salary after graduation.

Interest in Sierra hiking and history 
Alsup has spent much time in the Sierra Nevada mountains and published a book telling the story of the search for notable mountaineer Walter A Starr, Jr.

Awards and recognition 

2013:  Tara L. Riedley Barristers Choice Award, Bar Association of San Francisco
2013: Award of recognition from Lewis and Clark Law School.

See also 
 List of law clerks of the Supreme Court of the United States (Seat 4)

References

Sources

1945 births
Living people
20th-century American judges
21st-century American judges
Harvard Law School alumni
Harvard Kennedy School alumni
Judges of the United States District Court for the Northern District of California
Law clerks of the Supreme Court of the United States
Lawyers from Jackson, Mississippi
Mississippi State University alumni
People associated with Morrison & Foerster
United States district court judges appointed by Bill Clinton